International Buddhist Museum is the world's first International Buddhist Museum. It is located next to the National Museum of Kandy and Temple of the Tooth in Kandy, Sri Lanka. The site was the former Palace of the Kandian King, Wimaladharmasuriya, upon which the British constructed a Victorian era building, which housed the Kandy Kachcheri.

The museum was established with the contributions of 17 countries such as Sri Lanka, India, Bangladesh, Nepal, Pakistan, Japan, China, Korea, Indonesia, Thailand, Myanmar, Laos, Vietnam, Cambodia, Malaysia, Bhutan, and Afghanistan.

See also
List of museums in Sri Lanka

References

External links 
Monument of eternal friendship: Pakistan Pavilion at Buddhist Museum
The splendour of International Buddhist Museum, Kandy 

Buddhist museums
Cultural buildings in Kandy
Museums in Kandy District
Religious museums in Sri Lanka
Religious organizations established in 2011